Sigint or SIGINT may refer to:

 Signals intelligence, intelligence-gathering by interception of signals
 SIGINT (POSIX), a Unix signal
 Sigint (character), from Metal Gear Solid 3
 SIGINT (conference), a conference on the technical and social aspects of digital society